The men's 50 metre butterfly competition of the swimming events at the 2011 World Aquatics Championships took place July 24 and 25. The heats and semifinals took place July 24 and the final was held July 25.

Records
Prior to the competition, the existing world and championship records were as follows.

Results

Heats

56 swimmers participated in 7 heats, qualified swimmers are listed:

Swimoff
As two swimmers had the same time in the heats at place 16 they had to participate in a swimoff to determine the last semifinal swimmer.

Semifinals
The semifinals were held at 18:30.

Semifinal 1

Semifinal 2

Final
The final was held at 18:39.

References

External links
2011 World Aquatics Championships: Men's 50 metre butterfly entry list, from OmegaTiming.com; retrieved 2011-07-23.

Butterfly 050 metre, men's
World Aquatics Championships